Landscapes was a British melodic hardcore band based in Somerset, England. Formed in 2009, the band released one EP and two albums. They played at Hevy Music Festival and toured throughout Europe several times.

History
Previously named Counting Days, Landscapes was formed in Somerset in late 2009 by Shaun Milton (vocals), Martin Hutton (guitar), Kai Sheldon (previously drums, later guitar), Nick Willcox (bass guitar), and Joe Cornish (guitar).

Landscapes formed as a collective of friends looking to write and perform an alternative form of modern hardcore punk, originating in the United Kingdom. Originally named Counting Days, they later changed their name whilst writing their first EP, Reminiscence, and took on Landscapes from the lyrics of their song "Take Me Home"—written and dedicated to Shaun's grandmother, Belinda Hanham.

They released the EP Reminiscence via Broken Night Records in May 2010. In July 2012, the band published their debut album, Life Gone Wrong, originally on City of Gold Records. The first pressing sold out and in September 2013, the album was re-released after the band signed to Pure Noise Records, based in San Francisco, which released the record worldwide.

The band played at Hevy Music Festival in Kent on 4 August 2012, where they performed on the Red Bull Bedroom Jam Stage, alongside Brutality Will Prevail and Eisberg. Landscapes was the supporting band for Stray from the Path and The Ghost Inside on the Rock Sound Impericon Exposure Tour throughout the UK, which consisted of six concert dates between 18 and 23 February 2013. Together with Australian melodic hardcore band In Hearts Wake, Landscapes played a whole European tour as support for the Amity Affliction. The tour was named Brothers in Arms Tour and went through Germany, Austria, the UK, Belgium, and France. The band started a second European concert tour as support for Defeater in January 2014. Before that tour started, Landscapes played four headliner shows in Dresden, Bielefeld, Frankfurt, and Göttingen.

Landscapes supported the Used on their UK tour in February 2015.

They released their second album, Modern Earth, on 8 April 2016, via Californian label Pure Noise Records.

In January 2018, Landscapes deleted their Instagram and Facebook accounts and added to their Twitter bio: "Was a hardcore punk rock band, now dead. 2010–2018 RIP."

Musical style
Sebastian Berning of German online music magazine Powermetal.de described the music of Landscapes as "dark-lyriced melodic hardcore" and compared the group to Dead Swans, The Carrier, and Killing the Dream. The British Rock Sound wrote that the band was influenced by the post rock genre.

Band members
 Shaun Milton – vocals
 Kai Sheldon – guitar
 Martin Hutton – guitar
 Tom Paulton – bass
 Jordan Urch – drums
 Nick Willcox – bass
 Joe Cornish – guitar

Discography

Studio albums
 Life Gone Wrong (2012)
 Modern Earth (2016)

EPs
 Reminiscence (2010)

References

External links

 Landscapes on Facebook
 Landscapes at Discogs

Melodic hardcore groups
British hardcore punk groups
Musical groups established in 2008
Pure Noise Records artists